Cynthia Deyanira Rodríguez Ruiz (born May 8, 1984 in Monclova, Coahuila, Mexico) is a Mexican singer and reality television personality.

She was a contestant on the reality TV show La Academia, coming in fourth place. Rodríguez later competed on the reality show Desafio de Estrellas. She was voted off the show right before the finals, with only five other contestants left. Her album Soy was released in June 2006, just as she left Desafio de Estrellas. She was selected to sing the theme song for a television series on TV Azteca, called Looking for a Man.

Cynthia later played an important antagonist role in a Mexican "telenovela" called Bellezas Indomables. Concurrently, her second album Provocame was released in March, 2008.

In the present, Cynthia is playing the role of the protagonist's best friend in the "telenovela" Mujer Comprada, which airs daily on TV Azteca. At the same time, she is the hostess of a music videos show called Festival Azteca Music, which airs weekly on Azteca America. She is also planning the release of her third album for 2010.

Filmography

La Academia performances 

4th season of La Academia Azteca (2005)

 February 27, 2005 - "Sabes Una Cosa" by Luis Miguel
 A Duet with Erasmo Catarino
 March 6, 2005 - "Acción Y Reacción" by Thalía
 March 13, 2005 - "Con Los Años Que Me Quedan" by Gloria Estefan
 March 20, 2005 - "Me Equivoqué" by Mariana Seoane
 March 27, 2005 - "Todo Mi Corazón" by Yuri
 April 3, 2005 - "En Carne Viva" by Pandora
 April 10, 2005 - "Oleada" by Julieta Venegas
 April 17, 2005 - "Mi Problema" by Marisela
 April 24, 2005 - "Tengo Todo Excepto A Ti" by Luis Miguel
 May 1, 2005 - "Bandido" by Ana Bárbara
 May 8, 2005 - "Amor Se Paga Con Amor" by Jennifer Lopez
 May 15, 2005 - Ex-Contestants Show
 May 22, 2005 - "Con La Misma Piedra" by Alicia Villarreal
 May 29, 2005 - "Piel Morena" by Thalía
 June 5, 2005 - "A Cada Paso" by Luz Casal
 June 12, 2005
 Performs "Desesperada" by Marta Sánchez
 "Odio Amarte" by Ha*Ash. Second song performed was a duet with Silvia
 June 19, 2005
 "Tú" by Noelia
 "Quítame Este Hombre" by Pilar Montenegro
 June 26, 2005
 "Andar Conmigo" by Julieta Venegas
 "Cosas Del Amor" by Yuri and Ana Bárbara. Duet with Silvia

Grand Final
 July 3, 2005
 "Desesperada" by Marta Sánchez. The teachers of La Academia chose the song as her best performance
 "Te Amo" by Guadalupe Pineda
 She won 4th place. Erasmo Catarino was the 4th season winner, Yuridia was 2nd, Adrian 3rd, Edgar was 5th and Silvia placed 6th.

Desafio de Estrellas 2009

Discography

Albums

Singles

References

External links 
 
Official Website 
Official MySpace 

1984 births
Living people
La Academia contestants
People from Monclova
Musicians from Coahuila
21st-century Mexican singers
21st-century Mexican women singers